Shahrol Yuzy Ahmad Zaini (born 1976 in Teluk Intan, Perak) is a motorcycle Grand Prix rider from Malaysia. After his retirement from motorcycle racing at the end of 2002, he served as a full-time mentor of Team Petronas Sprinta Racing for the Malaysian Cub Prix from 2003 to 2007 before moving to Team Modenas Yuzy Pachi in 2008.

Career Highlights
FIM Asian Road Racing championship
FIM Spanish Championship 
FIM European Road Racing championship
FIM World Motorcycle Championship 2002, class 250cc

Career Statistics

By season

Races by year

(key) (Races in bold indicate pole position, races in italics indicate fastest lap)

References

External links
 MotoGP profile

1976 births
Living people
People from Perak
Malaysian motorcycle racers
125cc World Championship riders
250cc World Championship riders